Lucia Bosetti (born 9 July 1989, Tradate) is an Italian professional volleyball player. She plays for Italy women's national volleyball team. She has competed in the 2012 Summer Olympics. She is the daughter of Giuseppe Bosetti, former coach of Italy's volleyball female national team, and Franca Bardelli, who played 93 times for the latter; her sister Caterina also played for Italy's national team.

Awards

Club
 2009–10 CEV Champions League -  Champion, with Volley Bergamo
 2010–11 Italian League -  Champion, with Volley Bergamo
 2013 Italian Supercup -  Champions, with River Volley
 2012-13 Italian Cup (Coppa Italia) -  Champions, with River Volley
 2012–13 Italian League -  Champion, with River Volley
 2013-14 Italian Cup (Coppa Italia) -  Champions, with River Volley
 2013–14 Italian League -  Champion, with River Volley
 2014-2015 Turkish Volleyball Super Cup -   Champion, with Fenerbahçe Grundig
 2014–15 Turkish Cup -  Champion, with Fenerbahçe Grundig
 2014–15 Turkish Women's Volleyball League -  Champion, with Fenerbahçe Grundig
 2015–16 CEV Women's Champions League - Third place, with Fenerbahçe Grundig
 2015–16 Turkish Women's Volleyball League - Runners-up, with Fenerbahçe Grundig
 2016 FIVB Volleyball Women's Club World Championship - Runners-up, with Pomi Casalmaggiore

References

1989 births
Living people
Italian women's volleyball players
Olympic volleyball players of Italy
Volleyball players at the 2012 Summer Olympics
Fenerbahçe volleyballers
Universiade medalists in volleyball
Expatriate volleyball players in Turkey
Italian expatriate sportspeople in Turkey
Sportspeople from Varese
Mediterranean Games gold medalists for Italy
Mediterranean Games medalists in volleyball
Competitors at the 2013 Mediterranean Games
Universiade gold medalists for Italy
Medalists at the 2009 Summer Universiade
21st-century Italian women